John Milton Bradley (5 January 1935 – January 2023) was a British horse trainer who trained horses which competed in both Flat racing and National Hunt racing.

Bradley trained the winners of 1,037 races in a training career which lasted from 1970 to 2021. The best horse he trained was The Tatling, winner of the King's Stand Stakes in 2004.

References

1935 births
2023 deaths
British racehorse trainers